Wangan Township / Wang-an Township is a rural township in Penghu County (the Pescadores), Taiwan. It is the second smallest township in Penghu County after Cimei Township. The township is made up of nineteen islands, six of which are inhabited.

Name
The main island is Wangan Island, originally known as Bazhao / Pa Chao.

Geography

The township is located in the southern sea of Penghu. Islands in the township include:
 Wangan Island (Bāng-an-tó)
 Jiangjyunao Islet (Chiang-chün-ao hsü, Shōgunō-sho; ; Tsiong-kun-ò-sū)
 Hua Islet (Hua hsü, Hana-shima; ; Hue-sū)
 Mau Islets (貓嶼; Niau-sū)
 Cau Islet (草嶼; Tsháu-sū)
 Nan Un (南塭/南𥔋; Lâm-ùn)
 Maanshan Islet
 Chuanfan Reef
 Toujin (Thâu-kun)
 West Islet (Hsi-hsü-p'ing, Sei-sūpin; ; Sai-sū-phiânn-sū)
 East Islet (Tung-hsü-p'ing, Tō-sūpin; ; Tang-sū-phiânn-sū)
 Siji Islet (Hsi-chi hsü, Saikichi-sho; ; Sai-kiat-sū)
 Dongji Island (Dongji Islet, Tung-chi hsü, Tō-kichi-sho; ; Tong-kiat-sū)
 Chutou Islet (Tû-thâu-sū).

Geology
The northern side of the main island has a higher average elevation than the southern side. It consists of wave-cut platforms along its coastline.

Administrative divisions
There are nine villages on six of the nineteen islands, four of which are on the main island:
 Dongan/Dong-an/Tungan Village
 Si-an/Xian Village
 Jhongshe/Zhongshe Village
 Shuei-an/Shuian Village
 Jiangjyun/Jiangjun Village on Jiangjyunao Islet (Chiang-chün-ao hsü, Shōgunō-sho; 將軍澳嶼)
 Dongji/Tungji Village on Dongji Island (Dongji Islet, Tung-chi hsü, Tō-kichi-sho)
 Dongping/Tungping Village on East Islet (Tung-hsü-p'ing, Tō-sūpin)
 Siping/Xiping Village on West Islet (Hsi-hsü-p'ing, Sei-sūpin)
 Huayu Village on Hua Islet

Tourist attractions
 Blue Cave
 Budai Port
 Jiangjyun Island
 Jongshe Historic House
 Mau Islet
 Mount Tiantai
 South Penghu Marine National Park
 Wangan Green Turtle Tourism and Conservation Center
 Yuanyang Caves

Transportation

Wang-an Airport offers flights to Kaohsiung. There are also ferries to Magong and other nearby islands from Tanmen Harbor.

References

External links

【MIT台灣誌 #377】生態之島 望安 ('Made in Taiwan Annals of Taiwan #377: Ecological Island Wangan') 

Townships in Penghu County